Haynesville is an unincorporated community in  Richmond County, Virginia, United States. Haynesville is located on U.S. Route 360 east of Warsaw.

References

Unincorporated communities in Richmond County, Virginia
Unincorporated communities in Virginia